"Umbrella" is a song by American record producer Metro Boomin, Atlanta-based rapper 21 Savage and American rapper Young Nudy, from Metro's second studio album Heroes & Villains (2022). It was produced by Metro Boomin and David X Eli.

Composition
The instrumental of the song contains a piano loop, which Charles Lyons-Burt of Slant described as "chilling".

Critical reception
Hamza Riaz of Mic Cheque wrote in a review of Heroes & Villains, "There's no sensational beat that holds a candle to production like Without Warning's "Rap Saved Me" or the layers of "Don't Come Out the House", bringing up the "first twenty seconds" of "Umbrella" as one of the "closest moments" but also stating that the production "should have returned at some point in the song". Riaz considered "Umbrella" one of the best tracks from the album as well. Robert Blair of HotNewHipHop gave a positive review, writing, "the reverberating, poised piano of 'Umbrella' gives 21 Savage the chance to resummon the macabre energy of the Savage Mode team-up, alongside a highly complimentary verse from his cousin Young Nudy."

Charts

References

2022 songs
Metro Boomin songs
21 Savage songs
Young Nudy songs
Songs written by Metro Boomin
Songs written by 21 Savage
Songs written by Young Nudy
Song recordings produced by Metro Boomin